The Church of Santa Cruz is a church located in Santa Cruz, Chile. It was damaged during the 2010 Chile earthquake.

Roman Catholic churches in Chile
Buildings and structures in O'Higgins Region